Orepukia is a genus of South Pacific araneomorph spiders in the family Cycloctenidae, known only from New Zealand. First described by Raymond Robert Forster & C. L. Wilton in 1973, it was originally placed in Agelenidae, but was transferred to Cycloctenidae in 2017. Their webs are built on the ground between fallen branches, logs, and other debris, and they are commonly found on the South Island, but hardly ever anywhere else. Their eight eyes are in two rows, the anterior row straight and the other slightly curved. Their jaws are vertical and the labium is notched near the base.

Species 
 it contains twenty-four species:
Orepukia alta Forster & Wilton, 1973 — New Zealand
Orepukia catlinensis Forster & Wilton, 1973 — New Zealand
Orepukia dugdalei Forster & Wilton, 1973 — New Zealand
Orepukia egmontensis Forster & Wilton, 1973 — New Zealand
Orepukia florae Forster & Wilton, 1973 — New Zealand
Orepukia geophila Forster & Wilton, 1973 — New Zealand
Orepukia grisea Forster & Wilton, 1973 — New Zealand
Orepukia insula Forster & Wilton, 1973 — New Zealand
Orepukia nota Forster & Wilton, 1973 — New Zealand
Orepukia nummosa (Hogg, 1909) — New Zealand
Orepukia orophila Forster & Wilton, 1973 — New Zealand
Orepukia pallida Forster & Wilton, 1973 — New Zealand
Orepukia poppelwelli Forster & Wilton, 1973 — New Zealand
Orepukia prina Forster & Wilton, 1973 — New Zealand
Orepukia rakiura Forster & Wilton, 1973 — New Zealand
Orepukia redacta Forster & Wilton, 1973 — New Zealand
Orepukia riparia Forster & Wilton, 1973 — New Zealand
Orepukia sabua Forster & Wilton, 1973 — New Zealand
Orepukia similis Forster & Wilton, 1973 — New Zealand
Orepukia simplex Forster & Wilton, 1973 — New Zealand
Orepukia sorenseni Forster & Wilton, 1973 — New Zealand
Orepukia tanea Forster & Wilton, 1973 — New Zealand
Orepukia tonga Forster & Wilton, 1973 — New Zealand
Orepukia virtuta Forster & Wilton, 1973 — New Zealand

References 

Cycloctenidae
Spiders of New Zealand
Araneomorphae genera
Taxa named by Raymond Robert Forster